Pseuduvaria prainii is a species of plant in the Annonaceae family. It is endemic to the Andaman and Nicobar Islands. It is threatened by habitat loss.

References

prainii
Flora of the Andaman Islands
Flora of the Nicobar Islands
Vulnerable plants
Taxonomy articles created by Polbot